Escape Artists is a female-fronted Austrian pop punk band from Vienna and Lower
Austria.

History

The band was founded by Georg Glasl and Matthias Fellinger, the two guitarists, formerly playing in a band called Substitute. The catchy voice of Pia Glasl, Lukas Jelencsits on the drums and Mario Chytil on the bass (he replaced Ben Cox in 2012) complete the quintet. "Escape Artists Never Die", a song of the Welsh post-hardcore band Funeral for a Friend, was the decisive factor to name the band as the two founding members are
attached to it. In 2009 they released their first EP called 100 Beats per Minute. The song Nightmare is even part of Punk Kills Vol. 10, a Californian sampler. In early 2013 the debut album Tales in tune was published by Timezone Records.

Discography

Demos
2009: 100 Beats per Minutes

Sampler
2009: Punk Kills Vol. 10.

Records
2013: Tales in Tune

External links
 Official website
 Escape Artists at Timezone Records
 Portrait
  Artikel über die Escape Artists

Pop punk groups
Austrian punk rock groups
Musical groups established in 2009